Acropteris iphiata is a species of moth of the family Uraniidae first described by Achille Guenée in 1857. It is found in Japan, China and Korea.

The wingspan is 25–35 mm.

The larvae feed on Cynanchum, Metaplexis and Vincetoxicum (syn. Tylophora) species.

References

Uraniidae
Moths of Japan
Moths described in 1857